Hans Linde may refer to:
 Hans A. Linde, former Judge of the Oregon Supreme Court in the United States
 Hans-Martin Linde, German musician and author
 Hans Linde (Swedish politician), Swedish politician member of the Riksdag